Martin Harold Passaglia (April 22, 1919 – July 17, 2004) was an American professional basketball player. He spent two seasons in the Basketball Association of America (BAA) as a member of the Washington Capitols (1946–47) and the Indianapolis Jets (1948–49). He attended Santa Clara University, where he is a member of the school's sports hall of fame.

BAA career statistics

Regular season

Playoffs

References

External links
 

1919 births
2004 deaths
American men's basketball players
Basketball players from San Francisco
Guards (basketball)
Indianapolis Jets players
Santa Clara Broncos men's basketball players
Washington Capitols players